In nonlinear control, Aizerman's conjecture or Aizerman problem states that a linear system in feedback with a sector nonlinearity would be stable if the linear system is stable for any linear gain of the sector. This conjecture was proven false but led to the (valid) sufficient criteria on absolute stability.

Mathematical statement of Aizerman's conjecture (Aizerman problem)
Consider a system with one scalar nonlinearity

where P is a constant n×n-matrix, q, r are constant n-dimensional vectors, ∗ is an operation of transposition, f(e) is scalar function, and f(0)=0.

Then Aizerman's conjecture is that the system is stable in large (i.e. unique stationary point is global attractor) if all linear systems with f(e)=ke, k ∈(k1,k2) are asymptotically stable.

There are counterexamples to Aizerman's conjecture such that nonlinearity belongs to the sector of linear stability and unique stable equilibrium coexists with a stable periodic solution—hidden oscillation
.

Strengthening of Aizerman's conjecture is Kalman's conjecture (or Kalman problem) where in place of condition on the nonlinearity it is required that the derivative of nonlinearity belongs to linear stability sector.

References

Further reading

External links

Nonlinear control
Hidden oscillation
Disproved conjectures